The Center for Information Security Technologies at Korea University in Seoul, South Korea is the institute for contribution to the research and development of security such as security protocols (cryptography), network and system security, digital forensics. The Center does a major service to the national operating system related to information security.

Research network

Companies
 Microsoft
 Hidea
 MCURIX
 NHN
 LDCC

Government agencies
 Ministry of Information and Communication
 National Intelligence Service
 Defense Security Command
 National Police Agency
 Ministry of Public Administration and Security
 Supreme Public Prosecutor's Office
 Korea Institute of Finance and National Election Commission

Government-funded agencies
 ETRI
 KISA
 NSRI

Research fields

See also
Graduate School of Information Management and Security(Former Graduate School of Information Security)

External links
 Institute website

Institutes of Korea University
Information technology research institutes